LePreston Porter III (April 23, 1985 – February 26, 2022), better known by his stage name Snootie Wild, was an American rapper and singer. He was best known for his first single, "Yayo", which success helped launch his career. The song charted in the Billboard Hot R&B/Hip-Hop Songs chart. In October 2013, it was announced that a fellow Memphis-based rapper, Yo Gotti, had signed Wild to his Collective Music Group (CMG) imprint. In September 2014, Wild released his only extended play, Go Mode. The EP's second single, "Made Me", peaked at number 93 on the US Billboard Hot 100 chart, becoming the highest-charting single of his career. Snootie Wild signed to Epic Records/CMG with Yo Gotti.

Early life
Porter was born in Memphis, Tennessee, on April 23, 1985. He is the nephew of Arthur Lee from the rock band Love. He grew up listening to artists like Three 6 Mafia, Project Pat and Yo Gotti. He spent four years in prison from the age of 21 to 25.

Career
While signed under Heartland Entertainment, Wild released his breakout single "Yayo", which was produced by K-Figz. The song caught the attention of Yo Gotti, who later remixed the song, adding another verse. Gotti included the remix on his thirteenth mixtape Nov 19: The Mixtape, which was released on September 2, 2013. The song was again remixed by the Atlanta-based rapper T.I., which helped further its success. "Yayo", featuring Yo Gotti, became the official version and was released via digital distribution on February 3, 2014. The song debuted at number 50 on Billboard's Hot R&B/Hip-Hop Songs chart and at number 40 on Billboards Mainstream R&B/Hip-Hop chart.

On October 28, 2013, it was announced that Yo Gotti had signed Wild to his Collective Music Group (CMG) imprint. In December 2013, it was revealed Wild had secured a recording contract with Epic Records. He has since performed several times with Gotti, including on Gotti's national tour and a performance at B.B. King's in New York City. Wild released the music video for "Yayo" in March 2014. Wild also performed at the 2014 SXSW Interactive, in early 2014. The official remix of "Yayo" featuring Fabolous, French Montana, Jadakiss and YG was released on May 13, 2014. The remix appeared on CMG's first collective compilation project titled Chapter One, which was released on May 22, 2014. It has 16 tracks and includes Fabolous, Jadakiss, French Montana, YG and K Camp. Production was by Big Fruit, TK, Megaman, Nonstop and others. Wild is credited on five tracks of the mixtape, but appeared on one track more. On September 23, 2014, Wild released his first EP Go Mode.

On May 14, 2015, Wild released the mixtape Ain't No Stoppin, which included the single "Rich or Not". In August 2016, he was featured on the track "Believe" by the rapper Master P, which appeared on the latter's mixtape, The G Mixtape.

Death
On February 25, 2022, Porter was found in a ditch in Houston with gunshot wounds to his neck. He was hospitalized in critical condition, but died the following day at age 36. He left behind four children. His funeral was held in Memphis, Tennessee. Ten months after the crime, Ivory Duke Williams was arrested by Houston police and charged with the murder.

Discography

Extended plays

Mixtapes

Singles

As lead artist

As featured artist

Notes

Music videos

As lead artist

As featured artist

See also
List of murdered hip hop musicians

References

External links
 Snootie Wild official website

1985 births
2022 deaths
African-American male rappers
Epic Records artists
Rappers from Memphis, Tennessee
Southern hip hop musicians
21st-century American rappers
21st-century American male musicians
21st-century African-American musicians
20th-century African-American people
Deaths by firearm in Texas